The July 4 South–North Joint Statement, also known as the July 4 South–North Joint Communiqué, was the first joint statement by the governments of South Korea and North Korea, signed on July 4, 1972. The signatories of the statement were Lee Hu-rak and Kim Yong-ju, who represented the delegations from the south and north, respectively.

Pre-statement meetings 
On May 2, 1972, South Korean president Park Chung-hee sent Lee Hu-rak, the then-director of the Korean Central Intelligence Agency (KCIA), to Pyongyang to meet and discuss the prospects of improving inter-Korean relations and Korean reunification with North Korean premier Kim Il-sung. However, the North Korean delegation was represented by Kim Yong-ju, the director of North Korea's Organization and Guidance Department and Kim Il-sung's younger brother, instead of Kim Il-sung. The two delegations, headed by Lee and Kim, held talks over the course of four days, from May 2 to 5, 1972. North Korean Vice Premier Pak Song-chol, acting on behalf of Kim Yong-ju, later visited Seoul and held further talks with Lee Hu-rak from May 29 to June 1, 1972. A joint statement by the governments of the two Koreas was subsequently finalized on July 4, 1972.

Highlights 
The declared goals of the statement were "to remove the misunderstandings and mistrust, and mitigate heightened tensions... between the South and North", and "to expedite unification".

The two delegations agreed to the following principles as a basis for achieving Korean reunification:
 Unification shall be achieved independently, without depending on foreign powers and without foreign interference.
 Unification shall be achieved through peaceful means, without resorting to the use of force against each other.
 A great national unity as one people shall be sought first, transcending differences in ideas, ideologies, and systems.

See also 
 Inter-Korean summits
 Korean conflict
 Korean reunification
 Northern Limit Line

References

Further reading

External links 
 "The July 4 South-North Joint Communiqué" 

Politics of North Korea
Politics of South Korea
National unifications
North Korea–South Korea relations
Aftermath of the Korean War
Korean irredentism
1972 in Korea
1972 documents